The Clausura 2011 season (officially known as Torneo Clausura 2011 or also known as the Copa Capri for sponsoring reasons) will be the 26th edition of Primera División de Fútbol de El Salvador since its establishment of an Apertura and Clausura format. Isidro Metapán will be heading into this tournament as the defending champions. The season will begin in early 2011 and conclude in mid year. Like previous years, the league will consist of 10 teams, each playing a home and away game against the other clubs for a total of 18 games, respectively. The top four teams by the end of the regular season will take part of the playoffs.

Team information
Last updated: December 29, 2010

Stadia and locations

Personnel and sponsoring

Managerial changes

Before the start of the season

During the regular season

League table

Results

Playoffs

Semi-finals

First leg

Second leg

Final

Top scorers

Updated to games played on April 21, 2011.  Post-season goals are not included, only regular season goals.

Aggregate table

List of foreign players in the league
This is a list of foreign players in Clausura 2011. The following players:
have played at least one apetura game for the respective club.
have not been capped for the El Salvador national football team on any level, independently from the birthplace

A new rule was introduced this season that clubs can only have three foreign players per club and can only add a new player if there is an injury or player/s is released.

C.D. Águila
  Patricio Barroche 
  Matías Cresseri
  Diego Seoane 

Alianza F.C.
 None

Atlético Marte
  Glauber Da Silva
  Alcides Bandera
  Ramon Castillo

Atlético Balboa
  Julián Cruz
  Andres Medina
  Franklin Webster

C.D. FAS
  Alejandro Bentos
  Roberto Peña
  Marcio Teruel

 (player released mid season)

C.D. Luis Ángel Firpo
  Fernando Leguizamón
  José Oliveira de Souza

A.D. Isidro Metapán
  Ernesto Aquino
  Anel Canales
  Paolo Suárez

Once Municipal
  Luis Mendoza
  Publio Rodriguez
  Anthony Basile

UES
  Cristian González 
  Manuel García
  Raphael Alves da Silva

Vista Hermosa
  John Castillo
  Luis Torres
  Leonardo Da Silva

References

External links
 El Grafico League Coverage 

Primera División de Fútbol Profesional Clausura seasons
El
1